Kwak Bang-bang (born February 6, 1980, in Xuzhou) is a retired Chinese-Hong Kong-South Korean table tennis player. Born as Guo Fangfang in China, she played on the Hong Kong national team as Kwok Fong Fong from 2000 to 2005, and on the South Korea national team as Kwak Bang-bang from 2005 to 2008.

She helped Hong Kong win two bronze medals at the 2000 Asian Table Tennis Championships, including the women's doubles bronze with Song Ah Sim.

She helped South Korea win a bronze medal at the 2006 Asian Games. At the 2007 Asian Table Tennis Championships she won the mixed doubles gold medal with Oh Sang-eun.

References 

1980 births
Living people
Chinese female table tennis players
South Korean female table tennis players
Hong Kong female table tennis players
Chinese emigrants to South Korea
Sportspeople from Xuzhou
Table tennis players from Jiangsu
Naturalized citizens of South Korea
Naturalised table tennis players
Asian Games medalists in table tennis
Table tennis players at the 2002 Asian Games
Table tennis players at the 2006 Asian Games
Asian Games bronze medalists for South Korea
Medalists at the 2006 Asian Games